Lady Sukmok of the Im clan was the daughter of Im Myeong-Pil who became the 10th wife of Taejo of Goryeo and the mother of Crown Prince Wonnyeong. Her clan was not clear, but it was believed that she was came from the Jinju Im clan (진주 임씨, 鎭川 林氏). Although Wonnyeong's wife was unrecorded, they had 1 son, Crown Prince Hyodang (효당태자) and he later died in 976 due to Wang-Seon (왕선) who murdered him as the part of a policy of revenge against the aristocratic deterrence policy.

References

External links
숙목부인 on Encykorea (in Korean).

Year of birth unknown
Year of death unknown
Consorts of Taejo of Goryeo
People from Jincheon County